Tuina or Tui na is a Chinese form of massage therapy.

Tuina may also refer to:

Tuina (moth), a moth genus in the family Erebidae
Tuina maurella, a moth species found in Costa Rica
Tuina cingulata, a moth species found in Mexico, Honduras and Guatemala
Massage (novel), an award-winning 2008 Chinese novel by Bi Feiyu, translated to English in 2015
See Without Looking, a 2013 TV series based on Bi's novel
Blind Massage, a 2014 film based on Bi's novel